Želiv is a municipality and village in Pelhřimov District in the Vysočina Region of the Czech Republic. It has about 1,100 inhabitants.

Administrative parts
Villages of Bolechov, Brtná, Lhotice, Lískovice, Miletín, Vitice and Vřesník are administrative parts of Želiv.

Geography
It lies in the Křemešník Highlands. The Želivka River flows through the municipality. The Trnávka Reservoir is situated in the southwestern part of the municipality.

History

The first written mention of Želiv is from 1144.

Sights
Želiv is known for architecturally valuable Premonstratensian monastery with the Church of the Nativity of the Virgin Mary. The monastery was founded in 1139 and renewed in 1712 according to design by Jan Santini Aichel.

Trčka's Castle is a late Gothic castle from the second half of the 15th century, located in the monastery complex. Its current appearance is a result of a Renaissance reconstruction. Today it is owned by the monastery.

Twin towns – sister cities

Želiv is twinned with:
 Kiesen, Switzerland

References

External links

Villages in Pelhřimov District